William Mark Ormrod,  (1 November 1957 – 2 August 2020) was a Welsh historian who specialised in the Later Middle Ages of England. Born in South Wales, he studied at King's College, London, and then earned his Doctor of Philosophy at Worcester College, Oxford. He was employed at a number of institutions, eventually settling at the University of York where he became Dean of the History Faculty and director of the Centre for Medieval Studies. He researched and published widely, including nine books and over 80 book chapters. Ormrod retired in 2017 and died of cancer in 2020.

Early life 
Ormrod was born in Neath, South Wales, in 1957 to David and Margaret Ormrod, and had two younger brothers. He attended the local grammar school, where he was head boy; he played and sang music. He took a first-class undergraduate degree at King's College, London, in 1979, and undertook postgraduate study at Oxford University. He researched his D.Phil at Worcester College—examining Edward III's administration between 1346 and 1356—which was awarded in 1984.

Career
After completing his doctorate, Ormrod held positions at the University of Sheffield, Queen's University Belfast, and St Catharine's College, Cambridge, obtaining a lectureship at the University of York in 1990. The latter institution promoted him to Professor of History in 1995. He subsequently became Director of York’s Centre for Medieval Studies (1998–2001 and 2002–2003), Head of the Department of History (2001, 2003–2007), and Dean of the Faculty of Arts and Humanities from 2009 until taking early retirement in 2017.

Ormrod held numerous professional affiliations and memberships, being a Fellow of the Royal Historical Society, a Councillor of the Pipe Roll Society, a trustee of the Richard III and Yorkist History Trust, and a Fellow of the Society of Antiquaries. He had also been an editor of the Yorkshire Archaeological Press, the York Medieval Press, and the Parliament Rolls of Medieval England (PROME) project. He frequently collaborated with the Borthwick Institute for Archives, and was particularly interested in opening access to archives online. These projects included England's Immigrants, 1350–1550, which identified 70,000 immigrants to the country over the period, and contributed to the national curriculum. One of his last publications, his contribution to the Yale English Monarchs series on Edward III, has been described as “a first rate example of historical investigation", and an "exceptionally complex project that had defeated several earlier scholars".

In addition to his prodigious written output — “at least nine books, fourteen edited collections and well over eighty book chapters and articles“ — Ormrod acted as Principal Investigator for nineteen major research projects worth more than £4 million in external funding, and supervised twenty-eight doctoral dissertations. July 2020 brought publication of Monarchy, State, and Political Culture, a Festschrift compiled in his honour by his colleagues Gwilym Dodd and Craig Taylor. Dodd and Taylor also endowed the Mark Ormrod Prize, awarded annually to the best doctoral dissertation, on any medieval topic, at the University of York.

Death
He died of bowel cancer aged 62 on 2 August 2020; the proofs for his final monograph, Winner and Waster, were delivered to his publisher 10 days previously.

Select bibliography
As author

Winner and Waster and its Contexts: Chivalry, Law and Economics in Fourteenth-Century England, Cambridge, 2021.
Women and Parliament in Later Medieval England, London, 2020.
Edward III, London 2011 (English Monarchs series).
Political Life in Medieval England, 1300–1450, Basingstoke / New York, 1995. 
The Reign Of Edward III: Crown and Political Society in England, 1327-1377, 1990 
England in the Fourteenth Century: Proceedings of the 1985 Harlaxton Symposium, Woodbridge, 1986.

As editor
A Social History of England, 1200-1500, with Rosemary Horrox, Cambridge 2006. 
Fourteenth Century England, Woodbridge, 2004.
Time in the Medieval World, with C. Humphrey, York / Woodbridge 2001.
The Problem of Labour in Fourteenth Century England, with J. Bothwell and P.J.P. Goldberg, York / Woodbridge, 2000.
The Evolution of English Justice: Law, Politics and Society in the Fourteenth Century, with Anthony Musson, Basingstoke / New York, 1999.

Websites
England’s Immigrants 1330–1550, with Craig Taylor, Nicola McDonald, et al., York / London, Aug 2020.
Parliament Rolls of Medieval England, with Chris Given-Wilson, Paul Brand, Anne Curry, Rosemary Horrox, G. Martin, and J.R.S. Phillips, Woodbridge / Leicester, 2005.

References

1957 births
2020 deaths
Fellows of the Royal Historical Society
British medievalists
Alumni of Worcester College, Oxford
Fellows of St Catharine's College, Cambridge
Deaths from colorectal cancer
20th-century Welsh historians
20th-century English male writers
21st-century English male writers
Alumni of King's College London
21st-century Welsh historians
21st-century Welsh writers
Welsh male non-fiction writers
British university and college faculty deans
Academics of the University of York
Academics of Queen's University Belfast
Academics of the University of Sheffield
Deaths from cancer in England
Fellows of the Society of Antiquaries of London